Zhiltsov (from жилец meaning tenant) is a Russian masculine surname, its feminine counterpart is Zhiltsova. It may refer to
Konstantin Zhiltsov (born 1983), Russian football player
Lev Zhiltsov (1928–1996), Soviet Admiral 
Svetlana Zhiltsova (born 1936), Soviet TV presenter

Russian-language surnames